Novi Jankovci is a village in the Stari Jankovci Municipality in eastern Croatia.

Name
The name of the village in Croatian is plural.

History 
Novi Jankovci was most likely created in 1745, when Queen Marija Terezija decided that part of the land from Jankovci should be annexed to the Military Territory. A village was founded on the new land, where more than 30 Croatian and 8 Serbian families settled.

See also
 Jankovci railway station
 Church of St. Elijah, Novi Jankovci

References

External links
Aerial view of the village on the Stari Jankovci Municipality You-Tube Page

Populated places in Vukovar-Syrmia County
Populated places in Syrmia